Rhytiphora farinosa is a species of beetle in the family Cerambycidae. It was described by Francis Polkinghorne Pascoe in 1863.

References

farinosa
Beetles described in 1863